Sofia Ulrika Liljegren, also known as Sofia Uttini (1765 – December 6, 1795), was a Swedish-Finnish soprano. She was likely the first professional opera singer from Finland, although she was active in Sweden. She was given the title hovsångerska.

Sofia Liljegren was born in Rantasalmi in Finland. In 1781, she was engaged at the choir of the Royal Swedish Opera in Stockholm. 

In 1783, she was the replacement of Elisabeth Olin in the main part of Iphigénie en Aulide by Gluck, after which she was recommended to Gustav III of Sweden as a soloist.  She seem to have enjoyed a period of great popularity during the 1780s.  Her perhaps most known part was Clytaimnestra in Elektra by Hæffner. She is often mentioned among the most notable names in the Swedish opera during the late 18th century. Gustaf Löwenhielm, while referring to her as somewhat overestimated and not as good as Inga Åberg, does mention her as one of the few native talents in the period between the retirement of Elisabeth Olin in 1784 and the 1800 breakthrough of Jeanette Wässelius.  A sign of her notability was her appointment as hovsångerska. In the 1790s, her popularity declined somewhat.  

In 1791, she and her husband made plans to take over the Comediehuset in Gothenburg and settle there with her in the position of prima donna, but the plans were not realized. 

She married the composer Francesco Uttini in 1788.

References 
 Sohlmans musiklexikon (The Sohlman Music Dictionary) Volume 4  
 Georg Nordensvan: Svensk teater och svenska skådespelare Från Gustav III till våra dagar. Förra delen 1772–1842 (Swedish theatre and Swedish actors from the days of Gustav III to our days. Part I 1772–1842) Albert Bonniers Förlag (1917), Stockholm 
 Fredrik August Dahlgren: Förteckning öfver svenska skådespel uppförda på Stockholms theatrar 1737–1863 och Kongl. Theatrarnes personal 1773–1863. Med flera anteckningar. (List of Swedish productions staged in Stockholm theatres 1737–1863 and Royal Swedish Theatre personnel from 1773 to 1863. With numerous notes.)

References

1765 births
1795 deaths
Swedish operatic sopranos
18th-century Finnish women
18th-century Swedish women opera singers
Finnish operatic sopranos